Nils Johan Ringdal (6 March 1952 – 11 September 2008) was a Norwegian author and historian, known mostly for his works on Norwegian occupation history and Norwegian cultural history, and for his controversial book "Nationaltheaterets Historie 1899-1999" (The History of the National Theater 1899-1999). Ringdal had been living in various countries in Southeast Asia since 1988, along with his domestic partner Georg Petersen. Ringdal was found dead on 11 September 2008 in Denpasar, Indonesia.

References 

Dagbladet (in Norwegian)
Aftenposten (in Norwegian)
Verdens Gang (in Norwegian)

1952 births
2008 deaths
20th-century Norwegian historians
Norwegian gay writers
LGBT historians
21st-century Norwegian historians
20th-century Norwegian male writers
20th-century Norwegian LGBT people